The Transgender Law Center (TLC) is the largest American transgender-led civil rights organization in the United States. They were originally California's first "fully staffed, state-wide transgender legal organization" and were initially a fiscally sponsored project of the National Center for Lesbian Rights. The stated mission of TLC is to connect transgender people and their families to technically sound and culturally competent legal services, increase acceptance and enforcement of laws and policies that support California's transgender communities, and work to change laws and systems that fail to incorporate the needs and experiences of transgender people. TLC utilizes direct legal services, public policy advocacy, and educational opportunities to advance the rights and safety of diverse transgender communities.

Since launching in 2002, TLC has held over 250 transgender law workshops providing legal information to more than 3,250 community members, attorneys, social service providers, and business owners, as well as collaborated on public policy initiatives designed to improve safety in schools and prisons and safe access to public restrooms for transgender people in San Francisco. TLC successfully helped to revise San Francisco's "Regulations to Prohibit Gender Identity Discrimination" in December 2003, making them more inclusive of people who do not identify as strictly female or male, and to pass legislation in the City of Oakland banning gender identity discrimination in housing, employment, public accommodation, and city services.

Legal work
In 2015, the Transgender Law Center joined a lawsuit filed against the California Department of Corrections and Rehabilitation that resulted in a settlement that established a precedent of the state providing gender-affirming medical care.

In 2016, the Transgender Law Center and co-counsel filed a suit on behalf of a transgender high schooler who was prohibited from using the boys' bathroom. In 2017 the Seventh Circuit Court of Appeals unanimously ruled in favor of the student, finding that the school's policy violated Title IX and the Equal Protection Clause of the 14th Amendment.

Transgender economic health

The survey Good Jobs NOW!, conducted jointly by the Transgender Law Center and the San Francisco Bay Guardian in 2006, provided data on the economic reality experienced by transgender people and their families. The team surveyed 194 self-identified transgender people living, working, or looking for work in San Francisco. Survey findings included:

 Nearly 60% of respondents earned under $15,300 annually
 40% did not have a bank account
 Only 25% were working full-time
 10% were homeless

A statewide survey, "The State of Transgender California Report", was conducted in 2008. Findings included that respondents were more than twice as likely to live under the poverty line as the general population.

Nashville controversy
On May 21, 2018, members of the TLC as well as the Transgender Education Network of Texas were denied service at the Elliston Place IHOP in Nashville, Tennessee. The IHOP issued an apology.

References

External links

 Economic realities in the transgender community, The Race Equity Project, August 18, 2009
 "All Calif. Natives Can Change Sex on Birth Certificates", The Advocate, April 15, 2009
 "S.F. approves ID cards that exclude gender", USA Today, November 21, 2007
 "A Quest for a Restroom That's Neither Men's Room Nor Women's Room", Patricia Leigh Brown, New York Times, March 4, 2005
 "Couple Sue Agency Over Marriage Rule", Ann Simmons, Los Angeles Times, December 6, 2004
 "Mistrial in transgender case. Deadlock over first-degree murder charges3 to face retrial in slaying of Newark teen", San Francisco Chronicle, June 23, 2004
 "Posthumous request for a name change. Slain transgender teen's mom wants 'Gwen' to be official", San Francisco Chronicle, May 26, 2004
 Perspectives from the Transgender Law Center, Echoing Green Foundation, 2004
 "What's she doing in the men's jail?: Marched around half-naked. Raped. Kept in isolation. The life of a transgender prisoner in the Sacramento County Jail is basically hell.", Sacramento News & Review, February 13, 2003.
 "S.F. jailer allegedly fired in sex case. Transgender person suing for assault", San Francisco Chronicle, November 12, 2002
 "Transgender study finds bias/But S.F. still found to provide more protections than any U.S. city", San Francisco Chronicle, November 5, 2002
 "Transgender man sues S.F., police, saying he was beaten, taunted", San Francisco Chronicle, September 9, 2002

LGBT culture in San Francisco
Transgender law in the United States
Transgender organizations in the United States
Law in the San Francisco Bay Area
2002 establishments in California
Organizations based in Oakland, California